Mike Ocasio (born Michael Ocasio Arana) is a New York-based creative director, illustrator and figure artist. He is the lead illustrator for the children's book "The Pumpkin and the Pantsuit". Michael was born in San Juan, Puerto Rico.

References

Living people
Artists from New York (state)
Creative directors
American illustrators
People from San Juan, Puerto Rico
Year of birth missing (living people)